Galt Terriers may refer to two sports teams from Ontario, Canada:

Galt Terriers (baseball), a member of the Intercounty Baseball League
Galt Terriers (ice hockey), a former name of the Cambridge Hornets

See also  
 Terrier (disambiguation)